Henry John Fowler, Sr. (1909 - July 23, 1989) was a businessman and politician from Mechanicsville, Maryland who served as a Democratic member of the Maryland House of Delegates from 1950 to 1971.

Fowler was a president of the Maryland Jousting Tournament Association, and as a state Delegate, wrote legislation to make jousting the official state sport of Maryland.

There is no known connection to another Henry Fowler, who also served as a Democratic delegate from St. Mary's County in 1834-36 before moving to Wisconsin.

References 

1909 births
1989 deaths
Democratic Party members of the Maryland House of Delegates
20th-century American politicians